The vice president of Somaliland is the deputy head of state of Somaliland and the second highest official next to the president. The vice president is the constitutional successor of the president of Somaliland in case of a vacancy.

List of vice presidents of Somaliland

See also
 Somaliland
 Politics of Somaliland
 President of Somaliland
 Lists of office-holders

References
Various editions of The Europa World Year Book

External links
 Constitution in English
	

Politics of Somaliland
Government of Somaliland
Vice presidents of Somaliland
Somaliland